Lélis Lara (December 19, 1925 – December 8, 2016) was a Catholic bishop.

Ordained to the priesthood in 1959, Lara served auxiliary bishop of the Catholic Diocese of Itabira-Fabriciano, Brazil from 1976 to 1995; he then served as coadjutor bishop from 1995 to 1996 and as diocesan bishop from 1996 to 2003.

References

1925 births
2016 deaths
20th-century Roman Catholic bishops in Brazil
21st-century Roman Catholic bishops in Brazil
Roman Catholic bishops of Itabira–Fabriciano